The Chandman culture was a nomadic culture that existed in northwestern Mongolia in the Iron Age. It has been associated with the Scythian horizon.

History
The Chandman culture was excavated by Russian and Mongolian archaeologists in the 1970s near Chandmani Mountain, which is located near the city of Ulaangom. 

Radiocarbon dating of the Chandman remains ranges from 700 BCE to 300 BCE, a period spanning the Mongolian Iron Age. The Chandman culture has been linked to the nearby cultures at Sagly and Uyuk.

Population
The Chandman population seems to have been in particularly good health, as their skeletal remains show little evidence for pathological disease. Dental and skeletal evidence show no signs of stress.  However other analyses have shown injuries in the Chandman population related to horseback riding and combat. Several Chandman graves contained war hammers, and the cranial injuries associated with their use. The Chandman population likely practiced dairying, as dental remains show evidence of milk consumption.

Gallery

See also
Sagly culture

References

Archaeological cultures in Mongolia